Spotkanie w "Bajce" (Café From The Past) is a 1962 Polish psychological drama film directed by Jan Rybkowski. Also known as Meeting in the Fable, it was produced by Film Polski, and starred Aleksandra Śląska, Gustaw Holoubek, Andrzej Łapicki and Teresa Izewska. The writers Jan Rybkowski and Michal Tonecki developed it from a story Tonecki had originally written as a radio play.

Set in post-war Poland, the story is a marital triangle involving Victor a famous pianist, Teresa, and her husband Doctor Paul from whom she is separated. The three meet after fifteen years in a café called Fable (Bajce). The film was entered in the 3rd International Film Festival of India held in Delhi, India, from January 8–21, 1965.

Cast
 Aleksandra Śląska as Teresa
 Gustaw Holoubek as Paul
 Andrzej Łapicki as Victor
 Teresa Iżewska as Eve
 Maria Wachowiak - waitress
 Mieczyslaw Pawlikowski - President of MRN
 Mieczyslaw Fogiel - MRN employee
 Beata Barszczewska as Christie, daughter Teresa
 Magdalena Zawadzka - the daughter of the President of the MRN
 Stanisław Niwiński - truck driver

References

External links
 

1962 films
1960s psychological drama films
1960s Polish-language films
Polish black-and-white films
Films directed by Jan Rybkowski
Polish drama films
1962 drama films